Sarina Clark (born Sarina Fiso; 11 November 1981) is a New Zealand rugby league footballer who played for the New Zealand Warriors in the NRL Women's Premiership.

Playing career
Of Māori and Samoan descent, Clark first represented New Zealand in 2006 while playing for the Manurewa Marlins.

In 2008, she was a member of New Zealand's World Cup-winning side. In 2010, she was named the NZRL Women's Player of the Year. She won the award for a second time in 2016.

In 2017, Clark missed out on playing in her third World Cup due to pregnancy. On 13 September 2017, she was named the RLPA New Zealand Women's Player of the Year.

On 1 August 2018, Clark was named in the inaugural New Zealand Warriors NRL Women's Premiership squad.

On 21 January 2020, she was named on the wing in NRL.com's Women's Team of the Decade.

References

External links
NRL profile

1981 births
Living people
New Zealand Māori rugby league players
New Zealand female rugby league players
New Zealand women's national rugby league team players
New Zealand sportspeople of Samoan descent
Rugby league fullbacks
Rugby league centres
New Zealand Warriors (NRLW) players